Salmonella is a genus of rod-shaped (bacillus) Gram-negative bacteria of the family Enterobacteriaceae. The two species of Salmonella are Salmonella enterica and Salmonella bongori. S. enterica is the type species and is further divided into six subspecies that include over 2,600 serotypes. Salmonella was named after Daniel Elmer Salmon (1850–1914), an American veterinary surgeon.

Salmonella species are non-spore-forming, predominantly motile enterobacteria with cell diameters between about 0.7 and 1.5 μm, lengths from 2 to 5 μm, and peritrichous flagella (all around the cell body, allowing them to move). They are chemotrophs, obtaining their energy from oxidation and reduction reactions, using organic sources. They are also facultative anaerobes, capable of generating ATP with oxygen ("aerobically") when it is available, or using other electron acceptors or fermentation ("anaerobically") when oxygen is not available.

Salmonella species are intracellular pathogens, of which certain serotypes cause illness. Most infections are due to ingestion of food contaminated by animal feces, or by human feces, such as by a food-service worker at a commercial eatery. Salmonella serotypes can be divided into two main groups—typhoidal and nontyphoidal. Nontyphoidal serotypes are zoonotic and can be transferred from animal-to-human and from human-to-human. They usually invade only the gastrointestinal tract and cause salmonellosis, the symptoms of which can be resolved without antibiotics. However, in sub-Saharan Africa, nontyphoidal Salmonella can be invasive and cause paratyphoid fever, which requires immediate treatment with antibiotics. Typhoidal serotypes can only be transferred from human-to-human, and can cause food-borne infection, typhoid fever, and paratyphoid fever. Typhoid fever is caused by Salmonella invading the bloodstream (the typhoidal form), or in addition spreading throughout the body, invading organs, and secreting endotoxins (the septic form). This can lead to life-threatening hypovolemic shock and septic shock, and requires intensive care including antibiotics.

Taxonomy
The genus Salmonella is part of the family of Enterobacteriaceae. Its taxonomy has been revised and has the potential to confuse. The genus comprises two species, S. bongori and S. enterica, the latter of which is divided into six subspecies: S. e. enterica, S. e. salamae, S. e. arizonae, S. e. diarizonae, S. e. houtenae, and S. e. indica. The taxonomic group contains more than 2500 serotypes (also serovars) defined on the basis of the somatic O (lipopolysaccharide) and flagellar H antigens (the Kauffman–White classification). The full name of a serotype is given as, for example, Salmonella enterica subsp. enterica serotype Typhimurium, but can be abbreviated to Salmonella Typhimurium. Further differentiation of strains to assist clinical and epidemiological investigation may be achieved by antibiotic sensitivity testing and by other molecular biology techniques such as pulsed-field gel electrophoresis, multilocus sequence typing, and, increasingly, whole genome sequencing. Historically, salmonellae have been clinically categorized as invasive (typhoidal) or noninvasive (nontyphoidal salmonellae) based on host preference and disease manifestations in humans.

History 
Salmonella was first visualized in 1880 by Karl Eberth in the Peyer's patches and spleens of typhoid patients. Four years later, Georg Theodor Gaffky was able to grow the pathogen in pure culture. A year after that, medical research scientist Theobald Smith discovered what would be later known as Salmonella enterica (var. Choleraesuis).  At the time, Smith was working as a research laboratory assistant in the Veterinary Division of the United States Department of Agriculture. The division was under the administration of Daniel Elmer Salmon, a veterinary pathologist.  Initially, Salmonella Choleraesuis was thought to be the causative agent of hog cholera, so Salmon and Smith named it "Hog-cholerabacillus".  The name Salmonella was not used until 1900, when Joseph Leon Lignières proposed that the pathogen discovered by Salmon's group be called Salmonella in his honor.

In the late 1930s, Australian bacteriologist Nancy Atkinson established a salmonella typing laboratory – one of only three in the world at the time – at the Government of South Australia's Laboratory of Pathology and Bacteriology in Adelaide (later the Institute of Medical and Veterinary Science). It was here that Atkinson described multiple new strains of salmonella, including Salmonella Adelaide, which was isolated in 1943. Atkinson published her work on salmonellas in 1957.

Serotyping 
Serotyping is done by mixing cells with antibodies for a particular antigen. It can give some idea about risk. A 2014 study showed that S. reading is very common among young turkey samples, but it is not a significant contributor to human salmonellosis. Serotyping can assist in identifying the source of contamination by matching serotypes in people with serotypes in the suspected source of infection.  Appropriate prophylactic treatment can be identified from the known antibiotic resistance of the serotype.

Looking at the comparison of xMAP Salmonella Serotyping Assay With Traditional Serotyping and Discordance Resolution by Whole Genome Sequencing, study showed that molecular serotyping is promising as a rapid method for Salmonella serotyping.

Real-Time PCR Assay for Differentiation of Typhoidal and Nontyphoidal Salmonella is also available.

Detection, culture, and growth conditions

Most subspecies of Salmonella produce hydrogen sulfide, which can readily be detected by growing them on media containing ferrous sulfate, such as is used in the triple sugar iron test. Most isolates exist in two phases, a motile phase and a non-motile phase. Cultures that are nonmotile upon primary culture may be switched to the motile phase using a Craigie tube or ditch plate. RVS broth can be used to enrich for Salmonella species for detection in a clinical sample.

Salmonella can also be detected and subtyped using multiplex or real-time polymerase chain reaction (qPCR) from extracted Salmonella DNA.

Mathematical models of Salmonella growth kinetics have been developed for chicken, pork, tomatoes, and melons.  Salmonella reproduce asexually with a cell division interval of 40 minutes.

Salmonella species lead predominantly host-associated lifestyles, but the bacteria were found to be able to persist in a bathroom setting for weeks following contamination, and are frequently isolated from water sources, which act as bacterial reservoirs and may help to facilitate transmission between hosts. Salmonella is notorious for its ability to survive desiccation and can persist for years in dry environments and foods.

The bacteria are not destroyed by freezing, but UV light and heat accelerate their destruction.

Salmonella species can be found in the digestive tracts of humans and animals, especially reptiles. Salmonella on the skin of reptiles or amphibians can be passed to people who handle the animals. Food and water can also be contaminated with the bacteria if they come in contact with the feces of infected people or animals.

Nomenclature 
Initially, each Salmonella "species" was named according to clinical considerations, for example Salmonella typhi-murium (mouse typhoid fever), S. cholerae-suis. After host specificity was recognized not to exist for many species, new strains received species names according to the location at which the new strain was isolated. Later, molecular findings led to the hypothesis that Salmonella consisted of only one species, S. enterica, and the serotypes were classified into six groups, two of which are medically relevant. As this now-formalized nomenclature is not in harmony with the traditional usage familiar to specialists in microbiology and infectologists, the traditional nomenclature is still common. Currently, the two recognized species are S. enterica, and S. bongori. In 2005, a third species, Salmonella subterranea, was proposed, but according to the World Health Organization, the bacterium reported does not belong in the genus Salmonella.  The six main recognised subspecies are: enterica (serotype I), salamae (serotype II), arizonae (IIIa), diarizonae (IIIb), houtenae (IV), and indica (VI). The former serotype V was bongori, which is now considered its own species.

The serotype or serovar, is a classification of Salmonella into subspecies based on antigens that the organism presents. It is based on the Kauffman-White classification scheme that differentiates serological varieties from each other. Serotypes are usually put into subspecies groups after the genus and species, with the serotypes/serovars capitalized, but not italicized:  An example is Salmonella enterica serovar Typhimurium. More modern approaches for typing and subtyping Salmonella include DNA-based methods such as pulsed field gel electrophoresis, multiple-loci VNTR analysis, multilocus sequence typing, and multiplex-PCR-based methods.

Pathogenicity 
Salmonella species are facultative intracellular pathogens. Salmonella can invade different cell types, including epithelial cells, M cells, macrophages, and dendritic cells. As facultative anaerobic organism, Salmonella uses oxygen to make ATP in aerobic environment (i.e., when oxygen is available). However, in anaerobic environment (i.e., when oxygen is not available) Salmonella produces ATP by fermentation; by substituting one or more of four less efficient electron acceptors than oxygen at the end of the electron transport chain: sulfate, nitrate, sulfur, or fumarate.

Most infections are due to ingestion of food contaminated by animal feces, or by human feces, such as by a food-service worker at a commercial eatery. Salmonella serotypes can be divided into two main groups—typhoidal and nontyphoidal. Nontyphoidal serotypes are more common, and usually cause self-limiting gastrointestinal disease. They can infect a range of animals, and are zoonotic, meaning they can be transferred between humans and other animals. Typhoidal serotypes include Salmonella Typhi and Salmonella Paratyphi A, which are adapted to humans and do not occur in other animals.

Molecular modeling and active site analysis of SdiA homolog, a putative quorum sensor for Salmonella typhimurium pathogenecity reveals specific binding patterns of AHL transcriptional regulators. It is also known that Salmonella plasmid virulence gene spvB enhances bacterial virulence by inhibiting autophagy.

Nontyphoidal Salmonella

Non-invasive
Infection with nontyphoidal serotypes of Salmonella generally results in food poisoning. Infection usually occurs when a person ingests foods that contain a high concentration of the bacteria. Infants and young children are much more susceptible to infection, easily achieved by ingesting a small number of bacteria. In infants, infection through inhalation of bacteria-laden dust is possible.

The organisms enter through the digestive tract and must be ingested in large numbers to cause disease in healthy adults. An infection can only begin after living salmonellae (not merely Salmonella-produced toxins) reach the gastrointestinal tract. Some of the microorganisms are killed in the stomach, while the surviving ones enter the small intestine and multiply in tissues. Gastric acidity is responsible for the destruction of the majority of ingested bacteria, but Salmonella has evolved a degree of tolerance to acidic environments that allows a subset of ingested bacteria to survive. Bacterial colonies may also become trapped in mucus produced in the esophagus. By the end of the incubation period, the nearby host cells are poisoned by endotoxins released from the dead salmonellae. The local response to the endotoxins is enteritis and gastrointestinal disorder.

About 2,000 serotypes of nontyphoidal Salmonella are known, which may be responsible for as many as 1.4 million illnesses in the United States each year. People who are at risk for severe illness include infants, elderly, organ-transplant recipients, and the immunocompromised.

Invasive 
While in developed countries, nontyphoidal serotypes present mostly as gastrointestinal disease, in sub-Saharan Africa, these serotypes can create a major problem in bloodstream infections, and are the most commonly isolated bacteria from the blood of those presenting with fever. Bloodstream infections caused by nontyphoidal salmonellae in Africa were reported in 2012 to have a case fatality rate of 20–25%. Most cases of invasive nontyphoidal Salmonella infection (iNTS) are caused by Salmonella enterica Typhimurium or Salmonella enterica Enteritidis. A new form of Salmonella Typhimurium (ST313) emerged in the southeast of the African continent 75 years ago, followed by a second wave which came out of central Africa 18 years later. This second wave of iNTS possibly originated in the Congo Basin, and early in the event picked up a gene that made it resistant to the antibiotic chloramphenicol. This created the need to use expensive antimicrobial drugs in areas of Africa that were very poor, making treatment difficult. The increased prevalence of iNTS in sub-Saharan Africa compared to other regions is thought to be due to the large proportion of the African population with some degree of immune suppression or impairment due to the burden of HIV, malaria, and malnutrition, especially in children. The genetic makeup of iNTS is evolving into a more typhoid-like bacterium, able to efficiently spread around the human body. Symptoms are reported to be diverse, including fever, hepatosplenomegaly, and respiratory symptoms, often with an absence of gastrointestinal symptoms.

Epidemiology 
Due to being considered sporadic, between 60% to 80% of salmonella infections cases go undiagnosed. In March 2010, data analysis was completed to estimate an incidence rate of 1140 per 100,000 person-years. In the same analysis, 93.8 million cases of gastroenteritis were due to salmonella infections. At the 5th percentile the estimated amount was 61.8 million cases and at the 95th percentile the estimated amount was 131.6 million cases. The estimated number of deaths due to salmonella was approximately 155,000 deaths. In 2014, in countries such as Bulgaria and Portugal, children under 4 were 32 and 82 times more likely, respectively, to have a salmonella infection.  Those who are most susceptible to infection are: children, pregnant women, elderly people, and those with deficient immune systems.

Risk factors for Salmonella infections include a variety of foods. Meats such as chicken and pork have the possibility to be contaminated. A variety of vegetables and sprouts may also have salmonella. Lastly, a variety of processed foods such as chicken nuggets and pot pies may also contain this bacteria.

Successful forms of prevention come from existing entities such as the FDA, United States Department of Agriculture, and the Food Safety and Inspection Service. All of these organizations create standards and inspections to ensure public safety in the U.S. For example, the FSIS agency working with the USDA has a Salmonella Action Plan in place. Recently, it received a two-year plan update in February 2016. Their accomplishments and strategies to reduce Salmonella infection are presented in the plans. The Centers for Disease Control and Prevention also provides valuable information on preventative care, such has how to safely handle raw foods, and the correct way to store these products. In the European Union, the European Food Safety Authority created preventative measures through risk management and risk assessment. From 2005 to 2009, the EFSA placed an approach to reduce exposure to Salmonella. Their approach included risk assessment and risk management of poultry, which resulted in a reduction of infection cases by one half. In Latin America an orally administered vaccine for Salmonella in poultry developed by Dr. Sherry Layton has been introduced which prevents the bacteria from contaminating the birds.

A recent Salmonella Typhimurium outbreak has been linked to chocolate.

Typhoidal Salmonella

Typhoid fever is caused by Salmonella serotypes which are strictly adapted to humans or higher primates—these include Salmonella Typhi, Paratyphi A, Paratyphi B, and Paratyphi C. In the systemic form of the disease, salmonellae pass through the lymphatic system of the intestine into the blood of the patients (typhoid form) and are carried to various organs (liver, spleen, kidneys) to form secondary foci (septic form). Endotoxins first act on the vascular and nervous apparatus, resulting in increased permeability and decreased tone of the vessels, upset of thermal regulation, and vomiting and diarrhoea. In severe forms of the disease, enough liquid and electrolytes are lost to upset the water-salt metabolism, decrease the circulating blood volume and arterial pressure, and cause hypovolemic shock. Septic shock may also develop. Shock of mixed character (with signs of both hypovolemic and septic shock) is more common in severe salmonellosis. Oliguria and azotemia may develop in severe cases as a result of renal involvement due to hypoxia and toxemia.

Global monitoring
In Germany, food-borne infections must be reported. From 1990 to 2016, the number of officially recorded cases decreased from about 200,000 to about 13,000 cases. In the United States, about 1,200,000 cases of Salmonella infection are estimated to occur each year. A World Health Organization study estimated that 21,650,974 cases of typhoid fever occurred in 2000, 216,510 of which resulted in death, along with 5,412,744 cases of paratyphoid fever.

Molecular mechanisms of infection
The mechanisms of infection differ between typhoidal and nontyphoidal serotypes, owing to their different targets in the body and the different symptoms that they cause. Both groups must enter by crossing the barrier created by the intestinal cell wall, but once they have passed this barrier, they use different strategies to cause infection.

Switch to virulence 
While travelling to their target tissue in the gastrointestinal tract, Salmonella is exposed to stomach acid, to the detergent-like activity of bile in the intestine, to decreasing oxygen supply, to the competing normal gut flora, and finally to antimicrobial peptides present on the surface of the cells lining the intestinal wall. All of these form stresses that Salmonella can sense and reacts against, and they form virulence factors and as such regulate the switch from their normal growth in the intestine into virulence.

The switch to virulence gives access to a replication niche inside the host (such as humans), and can be summarised into several stages:

 Approach, in which they travel towards a host cell either via the intestinal peristalsis and through active swimming via the flagella, penetrate the mucus barrier, and locate themselves close to the epithelium lining the intestine,
 Adhesion, in which they adhere to a host cell using bacterial adhesins and a type three-secretion system,
 Invasion, in which Salmonella enter the host cell (see variant mechanisms below),
 Replication, in which the bacterium may reproduce inside the host cell,
 Spread, in which the bacterium can spread to other organs via cells in the blood (if it succeeded in avoiding the immune defence). Alternatively, bacteria can go back towards the intestine, re-seeding the intestinal population.
 Re-invasion (a secondary infection, if now at a systemic site) and further replication.

Mechanisms of entry 
Nontyphoidal serotypes preferentially enter M cells on the intestinal wall by bacterial-mediated endocytosis, a process associated with intestinal inflammation and diarrhoea. They are also able to disrupt tight junctions between the cells of the intestinal wall, impairing the cells' ability to stop the flow of ions, water, and immune cells into and out of the intestine. The combination of the inflammation caused by bacterial-mediated endocytosis and the disruption of tight junctions is thought to contribute significantly to the induction of diarrhoea.

Salmonellae are also able to breach the intestinal barrier via phagocytosis and trafficking by CD18-positive immune cells, which may be a mechanism key to typhoidal Salmonella infection. This is thought to be a more stealthy way of passing the intestinal barrier, and may, therefore, contribute to the fact that lower numbers of typhoidal Salmonella are required for infection than nontyphoidal Salmonella. Salmonella cells are able to enter macrophages via macropinocytosis. Typhoidal serotypes can use this to achieve dissemination throughout the body via the mononuclear phagocyte system, a network of connective tissue that contains immune cells, and surrounds tissue associated with the immune system throughout the body.

Much of the success of Salmonella in causing infection is attributed to two type III secretion systems (T3SS) which are expressed at different times during the infection. The T3SS-1 enables the injection of bacterial effectors within the host cytosol. These T3SS-1 effectors stimulate the formation of membrane ruffles allowing the uptake of Salmonella by nonphagocytic cells. Salmonella further resides within a membrane-bound compartment called the Salmonella-Containing Vacuole (SCV). The acidification of the SCV leads to the expression of the T3SS-2. The secretion of T3SS-2 effectors by Salmonella is required for its efficient survival in the host cytosol and establishment of systemic disease. In addition, both T3SS are involved in the colonization of the intestine, induction of intestinal inflammatory responses and diarrhea. These systems contain many genes which must work cooperatively to achieve infection.

The AvrA toxin injected by the SPI1 type III secretion system of S. Typhimurium works to inhibit the innate immune system by virtue of its serine/threonine acetyltransferase activity, and requires binding to eukaryotic target cell phytic acid (IP6). This leaves the host more susceptible to infection.

Clinical symptoms 
Salmonellosis is known to be able to cause back pain or spondylosis.  It can manifest as five clinical patterns: gastrointestinal tract infection, enteric fever, bacteremia, local infection, and the chronic reservoir state. The initial symptoms are nonspecific fever, weakness, and myalgia among others. In the bacteremia state, it can spread to any parts of the body and this induces localized infection or it forms abscesses. The forms of localized Salmonella infections are arthritis, urinary tract infection, infection of the central nervous system, bone infection, soft tissue infection, etc.  Infection may remain as the latent form for a long time, and when the function of reticular endothelial cells is deteriorated, it may become activated and consequently, it may secondarily induce spreading infection in the bone several months or several years after acute salmonellosis.

A 2018 Imperial College London study also shows how salmonella disrupt specific arms of the immune system (e.g. 3 of 5 NF-kappaB proteins) using a family of zinc metalloproteinase effectors, leaving others untouched.Salmonella thyroid abscess has also been reported.

Resistance to oxidative burst
A hallmark of Salmonella pathogenesis is the ability of the bacterium to survive and proliferate within phagocytes.  Phagocytes produce DNA-damaging agents such as nitric oxide and oxygen radicals as a defense against pathogens.  Thus, Salmonella species must face attack by molecules that challenge genome integrity.  Buchmeier et al., showed that mutants of S. enterica lacking RecA or RecBC protein function are highly sensitive to oxidative compounds synthesized by macrophages, and furthermore these findings indicate that successful systemic infection by S. enterica requires RecA- and RecBC-mediated recombinational repair of DNA damage.

Host adaptation 
S. enterica, through some of its serotypes such as Typhimurium and Enteritidis, shows signs of the ability to infect several different mammalian host species, while other serotypes such as Typhi seem to be restricted to only a few hosts. Some of the ways that Salmonella serotypes have adapted to their hosts include loss of genetic material and mutation. In more complex mammalian species, immune systems, which include pathogen specific immune responses, target serovars of Salmonella through binding of antibodies to structures such as flagella. Through the loss of the genetic material that codes for a flagellum to form, Salmonella can evade a host's immune system.  mgtC leader RNA from bacteria virulence gene (mgtCBR operon) decreases flagellin production during infection by directly base pairing with mRNAs of the fljB gene encoding flagellin and promotes degradation.  In the study by Kisela et al., more pathogenic serovars of S. enterica were found to have certain adhesins in common that have developed out of convergent evolution. This means that, as these strains of Salmonella have been exposed to similar conditions such as immune systems, similar structures evolved separately to negate these similar, more advanced defenses in hosts.  Still, many questions remain about the way that Salmonella has evolved into so many different types, but Salmonella may have evolved through several phases.  As Baumler et al. have suggested, Salmonella most likely evolved through horizontal gene transfer, formation of new serovars due to additional pathogenicity islands. and an approximation of its ancestry. So, Salmonella could have evolved into its many different serotypes through gaining genetic information from different pathogenic bacteria. The presence of several pathogenicity islands in the genome of different serotypes has lent credence to this theory.

Salmonella sv. Newport has signs of adaptation to a plant colonization lifestyle, which may play a role in its disproportionate association with foodborne illness linked to produce. A variety of functions selected for during sv. Newport persistence in tomatoes have been reported to be similar to those selected for in sv. Typhimurium from animal hosts. The papA gene, which is unique to sv. Newport, contributes to the strain's fitness in tomatoes, and has homologs in genomes of other Enterobacteriaceae that are able to colonize plant and animal hosts.

Research 
In addition to their importance as pathogens, nontyphoidal Salmonella species such as S. enterica serovar Typhimurium are commonly used as homologues of typhoid species. Many findings are transferable and it attenuates the danger for the researcher in case of contamination, but is also limited. For example, it is not possible to study specific typhoidal toxins using this model. However, strong research tools such as the commonly-used mouse intestine gastroenteritis model build upon the use of Salmonella Typhimurium.

For genetics, S. Typhimurium has been instrumental in the development of genetic tools that led to an understanding of fundamental bacterial physiology. These developments were enabled by the discovery of the first generalized transducing phage P22 in S. Typhimurium, that allowed quick and easy genetic editing. In turn, this made fine structure genetic analysis possible. The large number of mutants led to a revision of genetic nomenclature for bacteria. Many of the uses of transposons as genetic tools, including transposon delivery, mutagenesis, and construction of chromosome rearrangements, were also developed in S. Typhimurium. These genetic tools also led to a simple test for carcinogens, the Ames test.

As a natural alternative to traditional antimicrobials, phages are being recognised as highly effective control agents for Salmonella and other foodborne bacteria.

Ancient DNA 

S. enterica genomes have been reconstructed from up to 6,500 year old human remains across Western Eurasia, which provides evidence for geographic widespread infections with systemic S. enterica during prehistory, and a possible role of the Neolithization process in the evolution of host adaptation. Additional reconstructed genomes from colonial Mexico suggest S. enterica as the cause of cocoliztli, an epidemic in 16th-century New Spain.

See also 
 1984 Rajneeshee bioterror attack
 The Great Hormel Disaster of '98
 2008 United States salmonellosis outbreak
 American Public Health Association v. Butz
 Bismuth sulfite agar
 Food testing strips
 Host-pathogen interface
 List of foodborne illness outbreaks
 2008–2009 peanut-borne salmonellosis
 Wright County Egg
 XLD agar

References

External links 

 Background on Salmonella from the Food Safety and Inspection Service of the United States Department of Agriculture
 Salmonella genomes and related information at PATRIC, a Bioinformatics Resource Center funded by NIAID
 Questions and Answers about commercial and institutional sanitizing methods 
 Symptoms of Salmonella Poisoning 
 Salmonella as an emerging pathogen from IFAS
 Notes on Salmonella nomenclature
 Salmonella motility video
 Avian Salmonella 
 Overview of Salmonellosis — The Merck Veterinary Manual

 
Gram-negative bacteria
Pathogenic bacteria
Tropical diseases
Zoonoses
Rodent-carried diseases
Bacteria genera
Biological anti-agriculture weapons